The 2019 Joe McDonagh Cup was the second staging of the Joe McDonagh Cup since its establishment by the Gaelic Athletic Association in 2018. The fixtures were announced on 11 October 2018. The competition began on 11 May 2019 and ended on 30 June 2019.

On 30 June 2019, Laois won the Joe McDonagh Cup following a 3-26 to 1-21 defeat of Westmeath in the final at Croke Park. This was their first ever Joe McDonagh Cup title.

Offaly were relegated from the Joe McDonagh Cup after losing all of their group stage games.

Westmeath's Killian Doyle was the competition's top scorer with 3-61.

Team changes

To Championship 
Relegated from the All-Ireland Senior Hurling Championship

 Offaly

Promoted from the Christy Ring Cup

 None

From Championship 
Promoted to the All-Ireland Senior Hurling Championship

 Carlow

Relegated to the Christy Ring Cup

 Meath

Teams and venues

Five teams competed in the 2019 Joe McDonagh Cup - a reduction from six that competed in the inaugural competition.

Personnel and colours

Competition format

Initially each of the five teams play the other four teams in single round-robin matches. The top two teams after the round robin games play the third-placed teams in the Leinster and Munster championships in the two All-Ireland preliminary quarter finals with the Joe McDonagh Cup teams having home advantage. The top two teams also compete in the Joe McDonagh Cup final.

Promotion to Leinster or Munster SHC

If the Joe McDonagh champions are a non-Munster team, they are automatically promoted to the following year's Leinster Championship and the bottom-placed team in the Leinster Senior Hurling Championship are automatically relegated to the following year's Joe McDonagh Cup. If the champions are a Munster team, they must win a play-off with the bottom-placed team in the Munster Championship to gain promotion to the following year's Munster Championship.

Relegation

The bottom-placed team in the Joe McDonagh Cup, Offaly are automatically relegated to the following year's Christy Ring Cup and are replaced by the 2019 Christy Ring Cup Champions, Meath.

Group stage

Table

Rounds 1 to 5

Round 1

Round 2

Round 3

Round 4

Round 5

Final

Laois are promoted to the 2020 All-Ireland Senior Hurling Championship.

Statistics

Top scorers

Overall

Top scorers in a single game

Miscellaneous 

 Westmeath become the first county to contest consecutive Joe McDonagh Cup finals.
 Laois won their 1st championship in 17 years, winning the 2002 All-Ireland Senior B Hurling Championship.
 Offaly hold the dubious distinction of being the only team to be relegated to hurling's third-tier, having previously been relegated from the tier-one Leinster championship, in successive seasons.
 First-time Joe McDonagh Cup meetings:
 Offaly v Laois (Round 1)
 Westmeath v Offaly (Round 2)
 Offaly v Antrim (Round 3)
 Kerry v Offaly (Round 5)

References

Joe McDonagh Cup
Joe McDonagh Cup